The following is a timeline of the history of the city of Kigali, Rwanda.

20th century

 1907 - Kigali founded by Europeans in German East Africa when German Richard Kandt "sets up an administrative residence."
 1913 - Catholic Sainte-Famille Church built.
 1919
 Belgians in power.
 Commissaire Royal du Gouvernement Belge headquartered in Kigali.
 1922 - Kigali becomes part of Belgian colonial Ruanda-Urundi.
 1959 - Population: 4,273 (estimate).
 1962
 Kigali becomes capital of independent Republic of Rwanda.
 Population: 6,000 (approximate).
 1964 - National Bank of Rwanda headquartered in city.
 1966 - Bank of Kigali established.
 1970 - Population: 54,403 (estimate).
 1973 - Hôtel des Mille Collines in business.
 1975
 Lycée de Kigali (school) opens.
 Francois Karera becomes mayor.
 1976 - Roman Catholic Archdiocese of Kigali established; Vincent Nsengiyumva becomes archbishop.
 1977 - Regional organization to develop Kagera River headquartered in Kigali.
 1978 - Population: 116,227.
 1980s - "Smelting plant" begins operating.
 1986 - Amahoro Stadium opens.
 1990
 September: Catholic pope visits Kigali.
 Tharcisse Renzaho becomes governor of Kigali prefecture.
 1991 - Population: 234,274 city; 921,050 prefecture.
 1993 - United Nations Assistance Mission for Rwanda headquartered in Kigali.
 1994
 6 April: Presidents of Rwanda and Burundi assassinated.
 7 April: Massacre at Jesuit Centre Christus occurs at the start of the Rwandan genocide.
 9 April: Gikondo massacre occurs.
 23 May: "RPF army captures the Kigali Airport."
 4 July: The Rwandan Patriotic Army takes Kigali.
 1995
 New Times newspaper begins publication.
 1996
 Kigali Independent University founded.
  becomes Catholic archbishop.

21st century

 2002 - Population: 603,049.
 2003 - Kigalicity.gov.rw website launched (approximate date).
 2004 - Kigali Genocide Memorial Centre opens.
 2005 - National Institute of Statistics of Rwanda headquartered in city.
 2006
 Aisa Kirabo Kacyira becomes mayor (approximate date).
 Kandt House Museum of Natural History established.
 Some of Kigali-Ngali become part of Kigali City.
 2007 - City centennial observed.
 2008 - Rwanda Over The Counter Exchange established.
 2010 - Kigali Special Economic Zone established.
 2011
 February: Fidèle Ndayisaba becomes mayor.
 Kigali City Tower built.
 Rwanda Stock Exchange headquartered in city.
 2012 - Population: 1,132,686.
 2013 - City of Kigali Master Plan created.
 2014 - May: African Development Bank meets in Kigali.
 2015
 City of Kigali Town Hall built.
 Makuza building constructed (approximate date).
 2016
 January–February: Part of 2016 African Nations Championship (football) played in Kigali.
 February: Local election held; Monique Mukaruliza becomes mayor.
 October: International environmental agreement signed in Kigali.
 Kigali Convention Centre built.
 2017 - February: Pascal Nyamulinda becomes mayor.

See also
 Kigali history
 List of mayors of Kigali
 Chronology of the Rwandan Genocide, 1994
 Timeline of Rwandan history

References

Bibliography

External links

 
  (Images, etc.)
  (Images, etc.)
  (Bibliography)
  (Bibliography of open access  articles)
  (Bibliography)
  (Bibliography)

Kigali
Kigali
History of Rwanda
Years in Rwanda
Kigali
Kigali